{{safesubst:#invoke:RfD||2=Penile-penile sex|month = February
|day = 23
|year = 2023
|time = 14:58
|timestamp = 20230223145801

|content=
REDIRECT Frot

}}